Sanaba is a department or commune of Banwa Province in western Burkina Faso. Its capital lies at the town of Sanaba. According to the 1996 census the department has a total population of 29,525.

Towns and villages
The largest towns and villages and populations in the department are as follows:

 Sanaba	(6 402 inhabitants) (capital)
 Bendougou	(2 864 inhabitants)
 Bérenkuy	(435 inhabitants)
 Dio	(2 107 inhabitants)
 Founa	(1 677 inhabitants)
 Gombio	(292 inhabitants)
 Gnoumakuy	(440 inhabitants)
 Koba	(1 207 inhabitants)
 Kosso	(435 inhabitants)
 Kossoba	(1 975 inhabitants)
 Kounla	(452 inhabitants)
 Moussakuy	(1 139 inhabitants)
 Nemena	(1 017 inhabitants)
 Ouarakuy	(549 inhabitants)
 Pekuy	(293 inhabitants)
 Sorwa	(699 inhabitants)
 Soumakuy	(370 inhabitants)
 Timba	(241 inhabitants)
 Yenkuy	(278 inhabitants)
 Ziga	(6 653 inhabitants)

References

Departments of Burkina Faso
Banwa Province